The following railroads operate in the U.S. state of Maine.

Common freight carriers
Canadian Pacific Railway
Eastern Maine Railway (EMRY) (Owned by New Brunswick Southern Railway)
Operates Woodland Rail, LLC
Maine Northern Railway (MNRY) (Owned by New Brunswick Southern Railway)
Pan Am Railways (PAR)
St. Lawrence and Atlantic Railroad (SLR) (Genesee and Wyoming)
Turners Island, LLC (TI)

Passenger carriers

Amtrak (AMTK)
Belfast & Moosehead Lake Railway (BML)
Downeast Scenic Railroad (DSRX)
Seashore Trolley Museum

Two foot gauge railways 
 Boothbay Railway Village ( narrow gauge)
 Maine Narrow Gauge Railroad Co. & Museum ( narrow gauge)
 Sandy River and Rangeley Lakes Railroad ( narrow gauge)
 Wiscasset, Waterville and Farmington Railway ( narrow gauge)

Defunct railroads

Private carriers
Bald Mountain Railroad
Eagle Lake and West Branch Railroad
Ray Lumber Company
Schmick Handle & Lumber Company
Seboomook Lake and Saint John Railroad
South Bog Railway
Wild River Railroad

Passenger carriers
Acadian Railway
Green Mountain Cog Railway

Electric
Androscoggin Electric Company
Aroostook Valley Railroad (AVL)
Atlantic Shore Railway
Atlantic Shore Line Railway
Auburn, Mechanic Falls and Norway Street Railway
Auburn and Turner Railroad
Augusta, Hallowell and Gardiner Railroad
Augusta and Waterville Railway
Augusta, Winthrop and Gardiner Railway
Bangor Railway and Electric Company
Bangor, Hampden and Winterport Railway
Bangor and Northern Railroad
Bangor, Orono and Old Town Railway
Bangor Street Railway
Bath Street Railway
Benton and Fairfield Railway
Biddeford and Saco Railroad
Brunswick Electric Railroad
Brunswick and Yarmouth Street Railway
Calais Street Railway
Camden and Rockport Street Railroad
Cumberland County Power and Light Company
Eliot Bridge Company
Fairfield and Shawmut Railway
Hampden and Winterport Railway
Hampden and Winterport Electric Railway and Light Company
Kittery and Eliot Street Railway
Lewiston and Auburn Horse Railroad
Lewiston, Augusta and Waterville Street Railway
Lewiston, Brunswick and Bath Street Railway
Lewiston, Winthrop and Augusta Street Railway
Mousam River Railroad
Norway and Paris Street Railway
Old Town Electric Company
Old Town, Orono and Veazie Railway
Old Town Street Railway
Portland Railroad
Portland and Brunswick Street Railway
Portland and Yarmouth Electric Railway
Portland, Gray and Lewiston Railroad
Portland–Lewiston Interurban
Portsmouth, Dover and York Street Railway
Portsmouth, Kittery and York Street Railway
Public Works Company
Rockland, South Thomaston and Owls Head Railway
Rockland, South Thomaston and St. George Street Railway
Rockland Street Railway
Rockland, Thomaston and Camden Street Railway
Sanford and Cape Porpoise Railway
Skowhegan and Norridgewock Railway and Power Company
Somerset Traction Company
Thomaston Street Railway
Waterville and Fairfield Railroad
Waterville and Fairfield Railway and Light Company
Waterville, Fairfield and Oakland Railway
Waterville and Oakland Street Railway

Not completed
Portland and Rutland Railroad
Portland, Rutland, Oswego and Chicago Railroad

Notes

References

Bibliography 
 Association of American Railroads (2003), Railroad Service in Maine (PDF). Retrieved May 11, 2005.
 

 
 
Lists of railroads by US state
Railroads